The Levasseur PL.8 was a single engine, two-seat long-distance record-breaking biplane aircraft modified from an existing Levasseur PL.4 carrier-based reconnaissance aircraft produced in France in the 1920s. Levasseur built the aircraft in 1927, specifically for pilots Charles Nungesser and François Coli for a transatlantic attempt to win the Orteig Prize. Only two examples of the type were built, with the first PL.8-01 named L'Oiseau Blanc (The White Bird), that gained fame as Nungesser and Coli's aircraft.

Design and development
At the Pierre Levasseur Company in Paris, Nungesser and Coli, working closely with Chief Engineer Émile Farret and production manager Albert Longelot, assisted in the design of the new Levasseur PL.8 biplane. Based on the PL.4 developed for the Aéronavale to operate from the French aircraft carrier Béarn, the PL.8 was a conventional single-bay wood and fabric-covered biplane that carried a crew of two in a side-by-side open cockpit.

Major modifications included the reinforcement of the plywood fuselage, removing two of the forward cockpits with the main cockpit widened to allow Nungesser and Coli to sit side-by-side. In adding two additional fuel tanks mounted aft of the firewall, the three fuel tanks held a total of 4,025 litres (1,056 gallons) of gasoline.

The PL.8 also incorporated several safety features in case of ditching at sea. Apart from small floats attached directly to the undersides of the lower wing, the main units of the fixed tailskid undercarriage could be jettisoned on takeoff in order to reduce the aircraft's weight. The underside of the fuselage was given a boat-like shape and made watertight for a water landing. Nungesser and Coli's plan was to make a water landing in New York in front of the Statue of Liberty

A single W-12ED Lorraine-Dietrich  engine was used with the cylinders set in three banks spaced 60° apart from one another, similar to the arrangement used in Napier engines. The engine was tested to ensure it would last the entire flight and was run for over 40 hours while still in the Parisian factory.

The aircraft christened L'Oiseau Blanc  was painted white and had the French tricolor markings, with Nungesser's personal World War I flying ace logo: a skull and crossbones, candles and a coffin, on a black heart. The biplane carried no radio  and relied only on celestial navigation, a specialty of Coli from his previous flights around the Mediterranean.

In 1928, a second PL.8 was built, equipped with a Hispano-Suiza 12M 375 kW (500 hp) engine. Flown in 1928, the PL.8-02 was intended as a long-range record breaker but modified as an air mail carrier. On 20 December 1929, the second PL.8-02, registered F-AJKP to Cie Generale Aeropostale and based at Dakar while flown by pilot Henry Delaunay, was badly damaged when it hit a pothole on landing at Istres and not repaired.

Operational history
In April 1927, the first PL.8 was shipped from the factory for Nungesser to begin a series of proving tests to determine aircraft performance. Most of the flights were conducted around Villacoublay and Chartres. Once the tests were complete, L'Oiseau Blanc was prepared for its record flight.

Transatlantic flight

L'Oiseau Blanc took off at 5:17 a.m. 8 May 1927 from Le Bourget Field in Paris, heading for New York. The intended flight path was a great circle route, which would have taken them across the English Channel, over the southwestern part of England and Ireland, across the Atlantic to Newfoundland, then south over Nova Scotia, to Boston, and finally to a water landing in New York.

L'Oiseau Blanc had been carrying a sizable load of fuel, which would have given them approximately 42 hours of flight time. Crowds of people gathered in New York to witness the historic arrival, with tens of thousands of people crowding Battery Park in Manhattan to have a good view of the Statue of Liberty, where the aircraft was scheduled to touch down. After their estimated time of arrival had passed, with no word as to the aircraft's fate, it was realized that the aircraft had been lost.

Rumors circulated that L'Oiseau Blanc had been sighted along its route, in Newfoundland, or over Long Island, and despite the launch of an international search, after two weeks, further search efforts were abandoned.

As of 2008, the landing gear is the only confirmed part of the L'Oiseau Blanc remaining, and is on display at the Musée de l'Air et de l'Espace (French Air and Space Museum), in Le Bourget airport in Paris, the location from which L'Oiseau Blanc took off.

Operators

Cie Generale Aeropostale

Specifications: Levasseur Pl.8-01 L'Oiseau Blanc

See also
 History of aviation
 Transatlantic flight

References

Notes

Citations

Bibliography

 Berg, A. Scott. Lindbergh. New York: G.P. Putnam's Sons, 1999, First edition 1998. .
 Jackson, Joe. Atlantic Fever: Lindbergh, His Competitors, and the Race to Cross the Atlantic. New York: Farrar, Straus and Giroux, 2012. .
 McDonaugh, Kenneth. Atlantic Wings 1919–1939: The Conquest of the North Atlantic by Aeroplane. Hemel Hempstead, Herts, UK: Model Aeronautical Press, 1966. .
 Montague, Richard. Oceans, Poles and Airmen: The First Flights Over Wide Waters and Desolate Ice. New York: Random House, 1971. .
 Mosley, Leonard. Lindbergh: A Biography (Dover Transportation). Mineola, New York: Courier Dover Publications, 2000. .
 Stoff, Joshua. Transatlantic Flight: A Picture History, 1873–1939. Mineoloa, New York: Dover publications, Inc., 2000. .
 Will, Gavin. The Big Hop: The North Atlantic Air Race. Portugal Cove-St. Phillips, Newfoundland: Boulder Publications, 2008. .
 Wohl, Robert. The Spectacle of Flight: Aviation and the Western Imagination, 1920–1950. New Haven, Connecticut: Yale University Press, 2007, First edition 2005. .

External links

 L'Oiseau Blanc, check-six.com
 Picture of landing gear of L'Oiseau Blanc at the French Air and Space Museum
 "Charles Lindbergh Won the Prize, but Did His Rival Get There First?" by Sebastian Mofett, Wall Street Journal

1920s French civil utility aircraft
Biplanes
Levasseur aircraft
Single-engined tractor aircraft
Aircraft first flown in 1927